Trent Andrew Cutler is an Australian former professional rugby league footballer. Cutler played for Canterbury-Bankstown in the National Rugby League (NRL) competition on the wing.

Background
Cutler was born in Bankstown, New South Wales. He is the son of the former Canterbury player, Stan Cutler.

Playing career
As 2004 NRL premiers, Canterbury-Bankstown faced Super League IX champions, Leeds in the 2005 World Club Challenge. Cutler played on the wing in Canterbury's 32-39 loss. He made his NRL debut against the Cronulla-Sutherland Sharks in round 4 of the 2005 NRL season.

After three years with Canterbury, Cutler moved to Western Suburbs for the 2008 season. In 2009, he has returned to the Canterbury's NSW Cup feeder club, the Bankstown City Bulls.

External links
Official Trent Cutler Bulldogs profile
Official Trent Cutler NRL profile

References

1984 births
Australian rugby league players
Canterbury-Bankstown Bulldogs players
Rugby league wingers
Rugby league fullbacks
Living people
Rugby league players from Sydney